The 2001-02 Top 16 season was the top level of French club rugby in 2001-02. The competition was played by 16 team. 
In the first phase, two pool of 8 was Played. The first 4 of each pool was admitted to the "top 8", the tournament for the title, the other to a relegation tournament.

Biarritz won his third title, the first from 1939, beating Agen in the final

First round 
(3 point for victories, 2 point for drawn, 1 point for losses)

Poule A

Poule B

Relegation Pool 
The teams sum  to the point obtained in the first round, the point obtained in the matches played with the 4 team from other group (hone and away).

Top 8

Semifinals

Final

External links
 LNR.fr

Top 14 seasons
  
France